Robinson 2022 was the twenty-first season of the Swedish reality television series, Robinson and was also the last to have Anders Öfvergård as presenter. This season the show returned to the Dominican Republic after Robinson 2021 was filmed in Sweden. A 22nd season will be broadcast later in 2022, but with a new presenter. It will be the first time that Swedish Robinson is broadcast twice in the same year. This season featured the return of Gränslandet where this season, it began with returning players fighting for a chance to gain a spot in the game to have another chance to win Robinson. The season premiered on 20 March 2022 on TV4. The winner was the 32-year-old man Filip Johansson from Mariannelund, who entered as one of the original contestants.

Contestants

Challenges

Notes

References

External links

Expedition Robinson Sweden seasons
2022 Swedish television seasons
TV4 (Sweden) original programming